National Institute of Technology Srinagar (NIT Srinagar or NITSRI) is a public technical university located in Srinagar, Jammu and Kashmir, India. It is one of the 31 National Institutes of Technology (NITs) and as such is directly under the control of the Ministry of Education (MoE). It was established in 1960 as one of several Regional Engineering Colleges established as part of the Second Five Year Plan (1956–61) by the Government of India. It is governed by the National Institutes of Technology Act, 2007 which has declared it as Institute of National Importance.

NIT Srinagar admits its undergraduate students through Joint Entrance Examination (Mains), previously AIEEE. It has 12 academic departments covering Engineering, Applied Sciences, Humanities and Social Sciences programs. Also, the medium of instruction is English.

History

NIT Srinagar was established in 1960 as the Regional Engineering College, Srinagar. The first Chairman was Wajahat Habibullah IAS (2004-2014)It was one of the first eight Regional Engineering Colleges established by Government of India during the first Five Year Plan. The institute shifted to its present campus in 1965. The Regional Engineering College, Srinagar was upgraded to become the National Institute of Technology, Srinagar in July, 2003. In the same year, the institution was granted Deemed University status with the approval of the University Grants Commission, All India Council of Technical Education and the Government of India. On 15 August 2007 it became an Institute of National Importance under the NIT Bill passed by the parliament of India.

Location

The institute is located on the western bank of Dal Lake near the Hazratbal Shrine in the north eastern region of the Srinagar city.
The institute is located 23 km from the Srinagar International Airport and 13 km from Srinagar railway station.

Admissions
The admissions to undergraduate through  Joint Entrance Examination (Main) (JEE-Main) or Direct Admission of Students Abroad (DASA) (through SAT), for non-resident Indians. Admission to postgraduate courses is done based on Graduate Aptitude Test in Engineering (GATE) scores, through Centralized Counselling for M.Tech (CCMT) for M.Tech courses and though Joint Admission Test for M.Sc. for M.Sc. courses.

Academics
The university includes eight engineering departments, for Chemical Engineering, Civil Engineering, Computer Science and Engineering, Electrical Engineering, Electronics and Communication Engineering, Mechanical Engineering, Metallurgical and Materials Engineering, and Information Technology, as well as four Physical Sciences departments for Physics, Chemistry, humanities and Mathematics.

Campus and student life

NIT campus is located on the bank of Dal Lake. Hazratbal Shrine is at a walkable distance from the institute. The campus consists of academic buildings, student hostels with 100% residential facilities for faculty, staff, and students. The Health Centre provides medical care to students, teachers, staff, and family members.

The Central Library is automated and provides services seven days a week, catering to more than 3500 users belonging to 12 departments and centers. The library houses 75,000 books.

There are a campus-wide fibre optic and Wi-Fi network, which covers all the departments, teachers' quarters, and students' hostels. There are a central computer lab and computer labs in each Departments. Institute is also part of high speed National Knowledge Network.

The Institute provides separate hostels for the male and female students with separate mess facilities. There are also guesthouses available to meet additional temporary housing needs.

 Halls of residence
 Indus Boys Hostel (for 1st year B.Tech students).
 Chenab Boys Hostel (for 2nd year B.Tech students)
 Tawi Boys Hostel (for Mtech and Ph.D. students)
 Mansar and Manasbal hostel( For 3rd Year B.Tech Students)
 Jehlum Boys Hostel (for 4th year B.Tech students)
 8-Block Dal Boys' Hostel (For 4th and 3rd-year B.Tech Students)

 Dal Extension ' Hostel (Renovated)
 Girls' Hostel (Combined for B.Tech, M.Tech, and Ph.D. girl students) (All Years)

For the first three years of Btech, each hostel room is shared by 5 students each while in the 4th year each student is allotted a single room in the Jhelum hostel. The rooms in the Jhelum hostel are allotted on the basis of CGPA(up to the 5th semester). The students who are not able to get a single room in the Jhelum hostel are allotted Dal hostels where the students reside in the ratio of 2 students per room. The M-tech students and Ph.D. scholars are allotted the Tawi hostel during their stay on the campus. In the Tawi hostel, each room is shared by three students.

There is a Common Hall, adjacent to the hostels, which provides facilities for indoor games like table-tennis and carom, along with a gymnasium. The Institute has a Maintenance Engineering Centre set up under the Indo-Italian collaboration. The center caters to the maintenance engineering needs of the Institute and the region as a whole in respect of research, consultancy, and academics.

Technical festival
Techvaganza is the National Level Technical Festival (Tech-Fest) of NIT Srinagar. It usually occurs in the month of April every year.
3. 
Techvaganza is a national level technical festival held annually at National institute of technology Srinagar in Srinagar. It is the first Techno-Management festival in region. With the initiation of Techvaganza in 2009, it has emerged as one of the biggest technical carnival among all. The main aim is to uplift the technical level of the region and provide a platform for technical tender buds to innovate, fabricate and gain experience in the field of technology and management

Notable alumni
 Subhash Kak, Computer Scientist, Regents Professor and an Ex Head of Computer Science Department at Oklahoma State University, Stillwater
 Vijay Vaishnavi, Computer Information Systems Researcher and Scholar
 Mansoor Ali Khan, Member of the 13th Lok Sabha
Davoud Danesh-Jafari, Minister of Economy and Finance Affairs of Iran.
Narinder Kumar Gupta, Academician and Padma Shri Awardee.

See also

2016 NIT Srinagar Student Protests
 Indian Institutes of Technology
 Indian Institute of Science
 Indian Institutes of Management
 University of Kashmir
 Srinagar

References

External links
 

National Institutes of Technology
Universities and colleges in Srinagar
Engineering colleges in Jammu and Kashmir
Education in Srinagar
Educational institutions established in 1960
1960 establishments in Jammu and Kashmir
All India Council for Technical Education